Lita Baron (born Isabel Castro; August 11, 1923 – December 16, 2015) was a Spanish-born American actress and singer who appeared in movies and television shows for over 30 years.

Early life
Baron was born Isabel Castro in Almería, Spain, on August 11, 1923, and emigrated to United States with her family in 1928. Her parents were Pedro and Francesca Castro.

After moving, the family lived in River Rouge, Michigan, where she attended River Rouge High School.

Career 
Baron started her career in show business as a singer and dancer with Xavier Cugat's orchestra. Billed as Isabelita, she also had her own act in nightclubs in Hollywood.

Starting in 1944, she appeared in several Hollywood films and television series. Her last screen role came in the 1979 film Bitter Heritage, in which her then ex-husband Rory Calhoun starred. She later worked in radio and real estate.

Personal life
In 1948, Baron married Hollywood actor Rory Calhoun. The couple had three daughters: Cindy, Tami, and Lori. Baron and Calhoun divorced in 1970, and she cited his multiple extramarital affairs as one of the reasons for the separation.

Baron supported Barry Goldwater in the 1964 United States presidential election.

Death
Baron died in Palm Springs, California on December 16, 2015 at age 92. The cause of death was complications from a fall, which had resulted in a broken hip.

Filmography

References

External links

1923 births
2015 deaths
Spanish emigrants to the United States
People from River Rouge, Michigan
21st-century American women
Actresses from Michigan